Isa Sedigh (also known as Sedigh Alam or Sadiq Aʿlam,  "the knowledgeable Sadiq"; 1894–1978) was minister of education in Iran, and the third president of the University of Tehran.

Early life and education
Isa Sedigh was born in June 1894 in Hammam Ghebleh, Tehran. His father, Mirza Abdollah Shamloo, also known as Abdollah Sedigh Al-Tojjar Isfahani, was a grandson of Mirza Mehdi Khan Astarabadi.

Isa Sedigh finished his undergraduate education in Kamalieh School and Dar ul-Funun. After finishing school, he traveled to France with the first student expedition in 1911. In 1918, he completed his education in Versailles, Yvelines, receiving his bachelor's degree in mathematics from the University of Paris.

In 1930, upon receiving an invitation to study at Teachers College, Columbia University, Sedigh went to United States and, after one year, received his doctorate in Philosophy.

Career
Isa Sedigh was a member of the Socialist Party. He worked in the University of Cambridge as an assistant teacher of professor Edward Granville Browne in Persian literature. After returning to France, he made Persian one of his foreign languages classes, which students could choose as their foreign language course.

While Iran was under attack by the Russian empire, Sedigh wrote many related articles in The Times.

He returned to Iran in 1918; just after his arrival, he was selected as inspector of schools. He worked as the head of the education organization of Gilan Province.

Isa Sedigh served as chief of staff of the Ministry of Justice in Iran.

In 1921, he received the title of Sedigh Alam from Ahmad Shah Qajar per Samad Khan Momtaz os-Saltaneh's request.

He was a member of the Iranian constituent assembly when it officially began in 1921.

When Ali-Akbar Davar founded the Radical party, Sedigh was selected as vice president.

During his education at Columbia University, Abdolhossein Teymourtash asked Sedigh to plan the founding of a Dar ul-Funun (university) in Tehran. (Isa used the word Daneshgah (meaning a university) instead of Dar ul-Funun (meaning a complex institute for teaching various courses)) After returning to Iran in 1931, Reza Shah commanded him to found the University of Tehran.

He was selected as minister of education in Mohammad Ali Foroughi's first cabinet on September 21, 1941. Two years later, he was selected again for this position in Ali Soheili's cabinet. Sedigh maintained this position in Morteza-Qoli Bayat's (November 25, 1944) and Ahmad Qavam's (September 11, 1947) cabinets. Jafar Sharif-Emami selected him on October 11, 1960 as minister of education for the 6th time.

He was a member of the Iranian senate in its first term in 1949. He was also elected in its 2nd, 4th, 5th and 7th terms.

Death
Isa Sedigh died on June 5, 1978 in Tehran and was buried in Behesht-e Zahra.

At the time of Isa Sedigh's death he was survived by his beloved son Reza Sedigh, Ali Sedigh, Abbas Sedigh and his grandchildren; Peri Sedigh, Shannon Sedigh, Lilly Sedigh and Ammon Sedigh.

Selected publications
Fundamentals of math and intellectual problems, 1923
100 solved math problems, 1923
Industry of Iran in past and future, 1925
Scientific principles of education, 1928
One year in the United States, 1932
Modern method of education and training, 1935
Brief history of Iran's culture, 1937
History of Iranian culture, 1957
Source:

See also
Esmail Merat

References

Chancellors of the University of Tehran
People from Tehran
Government ministers of Iran
1894 births
1978 deaths